Óscar J. Brooks (1914–1984) was a Mexican screenwriter and film producer.

Selected filmography
 The Golden Boat (1947)
 Hypocrite (1949)
 The Woman of the Port (1949)
Sinbad the Seasick (1950)
 Women Without Tomorrow (1951)
 Oh Darling! Look What You've Done! (1951)
 In the Palm of Your Hand (1951)
 Chucho the Mended (1952)
 The Beautiful Dreamer (1952)
 Snow White (1952)
 The Night Falls (1952)
 Made for Each Other (1953)
 The Unknown Mariachi (1953)
 The Vagabond (1953)
 The Viscount of Monte Cristo (1954)
 Bluebeard (1955)
 Puss Without Boots (1957)
 The Phantom of the Operetta (1960)

References

Bibliography 
 Rogelio Agrasánchez. Guillermo Calles: A Biography of the Actor and Mexican Cinema Pioneer. McFarland, 2010.

External links 
 

1914 births
1984 deaths
Mexican record producers
People from Chihuahua City
20th-century Mexican screenwriters
20th-century Mexican male writers